Marion is an unincorporated community in Red Willow County, Nebraska, United States.

History
Marion was platted in 1901. The community was named for Marion Powell, a landowner.

A post office was established at Marion in 1902, and remained in operation until it was discontinued in 1953.

References

Unincorporated communities in Red Willow County, Nebraska
Unincorporated communities in Nebraska